This is a list of candidates of the 1959 New South Wales state election. The election was held on 21 March 1959.

Retiring Members

Labor
 Fred Cahill (Young)
 George Campbell (Hamilton)
 John Crook (Cessnock)
 John Freeman (Blacktown)
 John McGrath (Rockdale)
 Maurice O'Sullivan (Paddington)

Liberal
 Jim Clough (Parramatta)

Country
 D'Arcy Rose (Upper Hunter)

Legislative Assembly
Sitting members are shown in bold text. Successful candidates are highlighted in the relevant colour.

See also
 Members of the New South Wales Legislative Assembly, 1959–1962

References

1959